is the fourth studio album by Japanese singer Shizuka Kudo. It was released on October 4, 1989, through Pony Canyon. It is a concept album inspired by the music from Finnish Karelia. The album was entirely recorded in Finland and features the Helsinki Philharmonic Orchestra as well as a choir group from the University of Helsinki. Despite being composed and produced by Tsugutoshi Gotō, Karelia lacks any trace of the signature rock style of Gotō's other compositions. The record features lyrics penned by Taeko Onuki and also includes the first song written by Kudo herself, under the pseudonym Aeri. While in Finland, Kudo created oil paintings inspired by the people and landscapes, which were incorporated into the design of the album's packaging. Karelia was re-issued in APO-CD format on December 1, 1993.

Commercial performance
Karelia debuted at number two on the Oricon Albums Chart, with 131,000 units sold in its first week. It stayed at number two the following week, selling 65,000 copies. It slid to number three on its third charting week, with 33,000 copies sold. It fell to number five next, logging sales of 23,000 copies. The album held onto the top ten one last week, charting at number eight and selling 14,000 copies. It ranked at number seventeen on its sixth charting week, before dropping out of the top twenty the following week. Karelia charted in the top 100 for nine straight weeks, selling a reported total of 293,000 copies during its run. It was ranked number 39 on the year-end Oricon Albums Chart for the year 1989.

Track listing

Charts

Certification

Release history

References

1989 albums
Concept albums
Shizuka Kudo albums
Pony Canyon albums